The Morrow Pivot II, released in May 1985, was a portable personal computer 100% compatible with IBM PC Software. It was designed by Norman Towson and Micheal Stolowitz, and manufactured by Morrow Designs - based on the Pivot designed by Vadem Corp. With one drive, 256 KB RAM, and a monochrome backlit LCD, the Pivot II had a list price of US$1,995.

The Morrow Pivot II included one or two 5-1/4" floppy drives. This machine was in a vertical configuration with a fold down keyboard. This was called a "lunch box" style unlike the typical laptop today.  The only external component was a single AC adapter. It would have been a little top heavy except for the large Panasonic camcorder battery loaded into its base.

The Pivot II design was licensed to Zenith Data Systems for $2M and sold as the Zenith Z-171; Zenith sold over $500M to the US government, many to the Internal Revenue Service. The IBM-compatible Pivot was Morrow's first non-Z80 machine. While modern laptops don't share its design, it was arguably the most practical machine until desktops embraced 3-1/2" floppies. Robert Dilworth went from being General Manager of Morrow Designs to being CEO of Zenith Data Systems for years as part of Zenith's paying him to talk George Morrow into licensing the Pivot to them.

Osborne Computer Corporation licensed the original Pivot (not backlit, 80x16 line/480x128 display, 128 KB RAM, 16 KB ROM) from 1984 as the basis for their Osborne 3, known as the Osborne Encore in Europe.

See also 
George Morrow

References 

Early laptops